Aztec is a census designated place situated in Yuma County, Arizona, United States. It had a population of 47 as of the 2010 U.S. Census. As of July 2015, Aztec had an estimated population of 52. It is located along Interstate 8 to the west of Tenmile Wash.

Demographics

Aztec first appeared on the 1920 U.S. Census as the Aztec Precinct of Yuma County. It appeared again in 1930, and recorded having a Spanish/Hispanic majority (the census would not separately feature that racial demographic again until 1980). Aztec's population was 31 in 1940.The population was 65 in the 1960 census. In 2010, it was made a census-designated place (CDP).

References

Census-designated places in Yuma County, Arizona